The 1991 Dwars door België was the 46th edition of the Dwars door Vlaanderen cycle race and was held on 28 March 1991. The race started and finished in Waregem. The race was won by Eric Vanderaerden.

General classification

References

1991
1991 in road cycling
1991 in Belgian sport
March 1991 sports events in Europe